Cycloramphus fuliginosus is a species of frog in the family Cycloramphidae. It is endemic to southeastern Brazil and known from the Atlantic coastal forest between southeastern Bahia and Rio de Janeiro. Its common name is Tschudi's button frog. The specific name was originally spelled as fulginosus, but the incorrect subsequent spelling fuliginosus by André Marie Constant Duméril and Gabriel Bibron (1841) was followed by later authors and is now preserved on the basis of the "prevailing usage".

Cycloramphus fuliginosus is a common frog. It is a nocturnal species living in primary and secondary forest. Habitat loss is a major threat to it.

References

fuliginosus
Endemic fauna of Brazil
Amphibians of Brazil
Taxonomy articles created by Polbot
Amphibians described in 1838